Adipamide is the organic compound with the formula (CH2CH2C(O)NH2)2.  It is a white solid.  The dominant commercial interest in adipamides is related to their presence in nylons.

Adipamide is formed by treating dimethyl adipate with concentrated ammonia.

External links 
 MSDS at Oxford University

References

Carboxamides